Smurfit may refer to:

Alan Smurfit (born 1943), Irish retiree who won a World Series of Poker bracelet
Michael Smurfit, KBE, LL.D (honorary), (born 1936), businessman holding dual Irish and British citizenship
Tony Smurfit (born 1963), British-born Irish businessman
Victoria Smurfit (born 1974), Irish actress

See also
Michael Smurfit Graduate School of Business in Dublin, Republic of Ireland
Smurfit Kappa, European corrugated packaging company
Smurfit-Stone Building, 41 story, 582 foot (177 m) skyscraper in downtown Chicago, Illinois, USA
Smurfit-Stone Container, global paperboard and paper-based packaging company based in Creve Coeur, Missouri, and Chicago, Illinois, USA